Rama Mehta (1923–1978) was an Indian sociologist and writer who is remembered above all for her novel Inside the Haveli (1977). The book won the Sahitya Akademi Award for English-language works in 1979.

Her earlier works include Ramu, A Story of India (1966) and The Life of Keshaw (1969). Both emphasize the importance of education for boys. Ramu does not appreciate the sacrifices his parents have made for him until he sees their heartfelt disappointment after he misses a day at school in order to go to the fair.

Mehta's critical essay The Western Educated Hindu Woman (1970) describes the contrast between women in their twenties at the time of independence who were well educated and spoke English and their mothers who spoke no English and remained devout Hindus bent on maintaining traditions. Her The Hindu Divorced Woman (1975) brings out the disadvantages of a woman's acceptance of divorce which she may well live to regret.

References

1923 births
1978 deaths
20th-century Indian novelists
Indian women novelists
Women writers from Uttarakhand
People from Nainital
Novelists from Uttarakhand
20th-century Indian women writers